Gordon Lowe defeated Horace Rice 4–6, 6–1, 6–1, 6–4 in the final to win the men's singles tennis title at the 1915 Australasian Championships.

Draw

Key
 Q = Qualifier
 WC = Wild card
 LL = Lucky loser
 r = Retired

External links
  Grand Slam Tennis Archive – Australasian Open 1915
 

1915 in Australian tennis
Singles